Högvålen is a village near Tännäs in the Härjedalen province of Sweden. There have been at most around 100 inhabitants, but now only a few people live there. Högvålen is surrounded by mountains and big mires. According to Swedish statistics, it is not officially a village/locality (requires at least 200 people) nor a minor village/locality (requires at least 50 people).

It is the site of Högvålen Chapel (Högvålens kapell). The wooden chapel was inaugurated on 8 September 1960. It is associated with the parish of Tännäs-Ljusnedal in the Diocese of Härnösand.

References

External links

Populated places in Härjedalen Municipality
Härjedalen